Todd H. Otis (born June 22, 1945) is an American businessman and politician.

Early life and education 
From Minneapolis, Minnesota, Otis received his bachelor's degree in American history in 1967 from Harvard University. He then served in the Peace Corps from 1967 to 1969 and was stationed in Senegal. In 1970, Otis then received his master's degree in journalism from Columbia University.

Career 
Otis worked in corporate community affairs. He also wrote about nuclear energy and renewable energy. Otis served in the Minnesota House of Representatives from 1979 to 1991 and was a Democrat. Otis served as chair of the Minnesota Democratic–Farmer–Labor Party from 1990 to 1993. In 1994, he ran for Minnesota governor and Minnesota auditor but lost in both primary elections. His father was James C. Otis, who served on the Minnesota Supreme Court.

References

1945 births
Living people
Politicians from Minneapolis
Harvard University alumni
Columbia University Graduate School of Journalism alumni
Businesspeople from Minneapolis
Writers from Minneapolis
Peace Corps volunteers
Democratic Party members of the Minnesota House of Representatives